Stop the World may refer to:

Music

Albums
Stop the World, a 1989 album by Ghost Dance
Stop the World (Riddlin' Kids album), 2004
Stop the World (Right Said Fred album), 2011
Stop the World (Aranda album), 2012

Songs
"Stop the World", a 1989 song by British rock band Big Big Sun from their album of the same name (the song hit number 50 on the Billboard Mainstream Rock chart)
"Stop the World" (The Screaming Jets song), from the 1991 album All for One
"Stop the World" (Extreme song), from the 1992 album III Sides to Every Story
"Stop the World", a song by Goo Goo Dolls from their 1993 album Superstar Car Wash
"Stop the World", a song by The Clash from their 1994 compilation album Super Black Market Clash
"Stop the World", a song by Krokus from their 1995 album To Rock or Not to Be
"Stop the World", a song by Demi Lovato from her 2009 album Here We Go Again
"Stop the World" (The Big Pink song), released as a single in 2009

Other
Stop-the-world, a kind of garbage collector in computer science

See also
 Stop the World – I Want to Get Off (disambiguation)